Northgate Centre is a shopping mall located in the northern part of Edmonton, Alberta. It contains more than 70 stores and services. Its main anchor tenants are Marshalls, Safeway, and Walmart.

History
The mall first opened in April 1965 as Northgate Shopping Centre and was home to the Woodward's department store. A major renovation was completed in 1986, adding a second storey and twin two level parkades on the northwest and southwest corners, and the mall was renamed Northwood Mall. In 1998, First Capital Realty took ownership of the mall and a year later began a three-year redevelopment that was completed in 2002. The project included new locations for existing tenants Future Shop and Safeway, expanded space for Zellers and a refurbished second floor food court. The name was changed to Northgate Centre.

In 2011 Walmart announced that it had acquired the lease for the location of the Zellers anchor store, which subsequently closed. In October 2012, the Walmart Supercentre opened. Walmart, however, only kept the main level of the former Zellers; the remainder of the second floor was converted into office, medical and Service Canada space.
In the same year, Sport Mart closed to become Ardene. Subsequently, the Service Canada location was closed. On March 28, 2015 the Future Shop closed but then became a Marshalls in 2017. In May 2018 the Rexall location closed.

Notable Tenants
 Walmart (opened 2012, formerly Zellers)
 Safeway
 Marshalls (opened 2017, formerly Future Shop)
 Healthcare Solutions (relocated 2020 to former Rexall location, former location will become Dollarama)
 Ardene (opened 2013 or 2014, formerly Sport Mart)
 Dollarama (formerly Healthcare Solutions' former location)
 Game City (moved into former Coles Books after they closed)

Former tenants
 Zellers (closed 2012, now Walmart)
 Future Shop (closed 2015, now Marshalls)
 Lammle's Western Wear and Tackle (closed 2013, became Rexall, now Healthcare Solutions)
 Coles Books (now Game City)
 Rexall (closed 2018, now Dollarama)
 Chili's (closed 2018, the restaurant building has since been demolished and now replaced by a new building; McDonald's)
 Sport Mart (closed 2012, now Ardene)

Gallery

References

External links
Northgate Centre web page
First Capital Realty Property Detail

Shopping malls in Edmonton
Shopping malls established in 1965
Tourist attractions in Edmonton